Mother of the Bride (translit. Omm el aroussa) is a 1963 Egyptian comedy film directed by Atef Salem. The film was selected as the Egyptian entry for the Best Foreign Language Film at the 37th Academy Awards, but was not accepted as a nominee. The Film was remade in Turkish as Yedi Evlat İki Damat in 1973.

Plot
Zeinab and Hussein are the hard-working parents of a family in Cairo.  One day, their daughter announces that she is getting married.  When Zeinab and Hussein meet the groom's parents, the latter make a series of over-the-top demands for the wedding.

Cast
 Taheya Cariocca as Zeinab
 Imad Hamdi as Hussein
 Yousuf Shaaban as Jalal
 Hassan Youssef as Shafiq
 Madiha Salem as Nabila

See also
 List of submissions to the 37th Academy Awards for Best Foreign Language Film
 List of Egyptian submissions for the Academy Award for Best Foreign Language Film

References

External links
 

1963 films
1963 comedy films
1960s Arabic-language films
Egyptian black-and-white films
Films directed by Atef Salem
Egyptian comedy-drama films